The 1970 Lombard regional election took place on 7–8 June 1970. It was the first-ever regional election.

Electoral law 
Election was held under proportional representation with provincial constituencies where the largest remainder method with a Droop quota was used. To ensure more proportionality, remained votes and seats were transferred at regional level and calculated at-large.

Results
The Christian Democracy was by far the largest party and christian-democrat Piero Bassetti was able to form a strong center-left government with the support of the PSI, the PSU and the PRI. Bassetti was replaced by Cesare Golfari in 1974.

Seats by province

1970 elections in Italy
Lombardy